Orlando Mejía Rivera (born August 30, 1961) is a Colombian internist and graduated M.Phil., writer and thanatologist. He was born in Bogotá. Currently he lives in Manizales and is titular professor at the Universidad de Caldas faculty of medicine.

Works 
Essays
 Antropología de la muerte 1987
 Humanismo y antihumanismo, 1990
 Ética y sida, 1995
 De la prehistoria a la medicina egipcia: introducción crítica a la historia de la medicina, 1999
 La muerte y sus símbolos: muerte, tecnocracia y posmodernidad, 1999
 De clones, ciborgs y sirenas, 2000
 La generación mutante. nuevos narradores colombianos, 2002
 Los descubrimientos serendípicos : aproximaciones epistemológicas al contexto del descubrimiento científico, 2004
 Extraños escenarios de la noche: crónicas culturales, 2005
 En el jardín de Mendel : bioética, genética humana y sociedad, 2009
 Cronistas del futuro : ensayos sobre escritores de ciencia ficción, 2012
 La biblioteca del dragón : lecturas inolvidables, 2012Fiction'''
 La Casa Rosada, 1997
 Pensamientos de guerra, 2000
 El asunto García y otros cuentos, 2006
 El enfermo de Abisinia, 2007
 Recordando a Bosé, 2009
 Manicomio de dioses'', 2010

External links

References 

Colombian male writers
Colombian internists
People from Bogotá
1961 births
Living people